Anthony Joseph Garcia (born June 7, 1973) is an American serial killer and former medical doctor who was convicted of two separate double murders, committed in 2008 and 2013 in Omaha, Nebraska. Garcia was arrested in July 2013 and went to trial in October of 2016. He was found guilty on all counts and sentenced to death.

Early life and practice
Garcia was born on June 7, 1973, in Los Angeles, California, to Fred, a postal service worker, and Estella, a nurse born in Mexico. He has two younger siblings.

Garcia received his medical degree from the University of Utah in 1999. He then began a residency at St. Elizabeth's Medical Center where he remained for approximately six months before being forced to resign for "unprofessional and inappropriate conduct."

In July 2000, Garcia began another residency in the pathology department at the Creighton University Medical Center - Bergan Mercy in Omaha, Nebraska. He soon received poor reviews from Dr. Chandra Bewtra, a professor of his, who later told reporters, "He had an attitude problem. He just did not want to learn. I thought he was arrogant; he was mean. He liked to hurt people and derive pleasure from there. And so he was not a nice person." Garcia responded to Bewtra's reviews with threats to sue.
Despite his threats, Garcia was terminated for "erratic behavior" within a year by Drs. William Hunter and Roger Brumback.

Garcia then moved on to the University of Illinois Chicago (UIC), where he worked from 2001 to 2003. He later told authorities that he left due to poor health, migraine headaches, and depression.

Then, Garcia enrolled in a psychiatry residency program at LSU Health Sciences Center Shreveport in Shreveport, Louisiana. He remained there until February 27, 2008, when the State Board of Medical Examiners informed him that he may not qualify for a medical license, due to the fact he had not reported his failure to finish the pathology programs at Creighton or UIC. Garcia left the next day. He then applied for and received a temporary license to practice medicine in Indiana, until he withdrew that application.

In 2009, Garcia was hired to work as a contract physician in Chicago.

The Creighton murders
On March 13, 2008, about two weeks after Garcia left LSU, Dr. William Hunter arrived at his home in Dundee and found the bodies of his 11-year-old son Thomas and 57-year-old housekeeper Shirlee Sherman, both of whom had been stabbed to death with knives apparently taken from the home's kitchen. Omaha police detectives Derek Mois and Scott Warner were assigned to the case. Witnesses described a heavy-set olive-skinned male in the vicinity, correlating him to a silver Honda CRV with an out-of-state license plate. Police produced a sketch of the man's face based on those descriptions.

Omaha police investigated the Hunter family including Thomas' online gaming presence but found no leads. Additionally, detectives investigated Shirlee Sherman and her family, theorizing that she may have been the intended target, but also found no viable suspects. They also investigated another stabbing that had occurred in the area, but detectives could not find a connection between the suspect in that case and the murders at the Hunter home. Shirlee Sherman's family offered a $50,000 reward for information on the case and also hired a private investigator. However, a year after the murders, the case went cold.

On May 14, 2013, piano mover Jason Peterson and his crew arrived at the home of Roger Brumback and his wife Mary. First thinking no one was home, one mover noted a handgun magazine lying in the home's open doorway and police were called. Peterson later told reporters that he saw Roger Brumback's body in the home, but no blood.

Coincidentally, detectives Mois and Warner were dispatched to the Brumback home. Detectives found that Roger had multiple gunshot wounds and a stab wound to his neck, and Mary had been stabbed to death, apparently with knives taken from the home's kitchen. Mois later stated that he and his partner immediately thought that the murders were similar to those at the Hunter home, and their suspicion of a connection between the crimes was bolstered when police learned that Dr. Brumback had been a colleague of Dr. Hunter. Additionally, it was determined that the couple had been dead for a day or two. Reporter Todd Cooper noted that the Brumbacks were last seen and heard from the previous Sunday, Mother's Day, during an online chat with their daughter.

Additionally, four days after the Brumback murders, Dr. Chanda Bewtra reported that someone had attempted to break into her home on Mother's Day. She and her husband were not home at the time, and she noted that nothing was missing. Police surmised that the intruder was scared off by the home's alarm system.

Investigations and arrest
After the Brumback murders, it was theorized that the attempted break-in at the Bewtra home was connected to the double homicides. Mois came upon Garcia's file and saw that Garcia's dismissal from Creighton had interfered with his ability to get employment or licensure in other states, and surmised that Garcia had enough motive to harm all three doctors.

Mois then confirmed that Garcia, now living in Terre Haute, Indiana, had purchased a firearm that would fit the magazine found at the Brumback home shortly before the Brumback murders. Also, Garcia's credit card had been used twice in the area near the Brumback murders on that Mother's Day, and Garcia's phone showed a search for the Brumback address only a few minutes after the alarm sounded at the Bewtra home.

Omaha detectives coordinated with Indiana law enforcement and the FBI to track Garcia. On July 15, he was arrested on a highway in Union County, Illinois. As his blood alcohol level was twice the legal limit, Garcia was immediately charged with DUI. When officers searched his car, they found a .45 caliber handgun, 50 bullets, an LSU lab coat, and a stethoscope. Nebraska authorities then took him into custody and charged Garcia with four counts of first-degree murder and use of a handgun. The State of Illinois suspended his medical license within days of his arrest.

Trial, conviction, sentencing
Garcia's trial began on October 3, 2016. Douglas County Attorneys Don Kleine and Brenda Beadle prosecuted the case. Defense counsel included lead attorney Bob Motta Jr., his wife Alison Motta, father Robert Motta Sr., and Jeremy Jorgenson. However, before the trial began, Judge Gary Randall removed Alison Motta from the case for trying to "poison the jury pool" after she made public statements about DNA evidence.

During the trial, prosecutors showed evidence from Garcia's home including a trash bag in the kitchen sink, in which were his termination letter from Creighton and handwritten notes with a "to-do" list that included such items as "put tape on your fingers" and "buy common shoes." Investigators also found that when Garcia was in Louisiana, he had owned a silver Honda CRV fitting the description of the car seen around the Hunter home at the time of the first killings. In addition, his saliva sample matched DNA left behind by the intruder who had broken into the Bewtra's house on the day the Brumbacks were killed.

Prosecutors also called a former stripper from Terre Haute, Cecilia Hoffman, who said that four years after the Dundee murders, when Garcia had tried to pursue her romantically, she attempted to rebuff him by saying that she only dated "bad boys." According to her statements, Garcia responded by saying that he had "killed a young boy and an old woman." Motta responded by noting that she had admitted to drinking the day of her conversation with the police about the incident, but Hoffman denied being drunk.

Prosecutors also pointed out that the four victims had been stabbed in a similar manner and that the gun found in Garcia's car matched the type of handgun magazine that had been left behind at the Brumback crime scene. Throughout a majority of the proceedings, Garcia wore headphones and appeared to be asleep.

On October 26, 2016, Garcia was convicted on nine counts; four counts of first-degree murder, four counts of use of a deadly weapon to commit a felony, and one count of felony burglary. The Mottas withdrew from the case before sentencing, leaving Garcia with a public defender. Sentencing was initially delayed, as the state of Nebraska was set to vote on whether to repeal or retain the death penalty. In November of that year, the state voted to retain the death penalty, and in September 2018, a three-judge panel sentenced Garcia to death.

Post conviction
As of March 2023, Garcia remains on death row at the Tecumseh State Correctional Institution in Tecumseh. In November 2022, the public defender's office began attempts to appeal his sentencing and by March 2023 had filed a motion for a new trial, calling his previous attorneys "a nightmare."

In 2014, detectives Derek Mois, Scott Warner, Ryan Davis, and Nick Herfordt were named Crime Stoppers Officer of the Year for their work on the Garcia case.

In 2010, Creighton University unveiled a memorial to Thomas Hunter, installed on the southeast lawn of the school's Cardiac Center.

48 Hours reported on the case in the 2017 episode, "Resident Evil". Dateline reported on the case in a two-hour 2017 episode, "Haunting". A fictionalized version of the case was included in the true crime series, James Patterson’s Murder is Forever, on the Investigation Discovery channel.

See also
 Capital punishment in Nebraska
 List of death row inmates in Nebraska
 List of serial killers in the United States

References

External links
 Nebraska Inmate Locator

1973 births
21st-century American criminals
American male criminals
American murderers of children
American people convicted of murder
American physicians
American prisoners sentenced to death
American serial killers
Criminals from Los Angeles
Living people
Male serial killers
People convicted of murder by Nebraska
Prisoners sentenced to death by Nebraska
University of Utah alumni
American people of Mexican descent